KCRT may refer to:

 KCRT (AM), a radio station (1240 AM) licensed to Trinidad, Colorado, United States
 KCRT-FM, a radio station (92.5 FM) licensed to Trinidad, Colorado, United States
 Z.M. Jack Stell Field (ICAO code KCRT) in Crossett, Arkansas, United States